Richard Tenguerian (born, August 3, 1955) is an architectural model maker of Armenian descent. Some of his notable physical models include the Kingdom Center in Riyadh (1998), Yankee Stadium in New York (2006), The Sail @ Marina Bay in Singapore (2007), and Comcast Center in Philadelphia (2008). More recently, he has made architectural models for the New Tappan Zee Bridge in New York (2013), CBS Sixty Minutes, and the Hudson Yards Redevelopment Project in New York (2014). He is the founding principal of Tenguerian Models and resides in New York City.

Early life 
Richard Tenguerian was born in Aleppo, Syria. His parents are survivors of the Armenian genocide . His father, Antranig Tenguerian, was a sculptor and his mother, Mary Tenguerian, was a fashion designer who worked for Chanel Studio in Lebanon .

At age 14, while attending school, Richard entered a summer internship program with one of Lebanon's leading architectural firms, where he made his first model. He applied to the American University in Beirut, but the 1975 Lebanese Civil War thwarted his intentions.

Career 

At age 21, Richard visited a relative in New York and was intrigued by the opportunities the city offered. He began working as a model maker, and built a reputation in the architectural community, which helped him finance his undergraduate education. He earned a bachelor's degree in architecture from the Pratt Institute.

Encouraged by the high demand for model makers in the architectural community, Richard started his own company, becoming a pioneer in the field. Early on in his career, he was contacted by the legendary architect Philip Johnson, who sought his services, thus paving his way to greater accomplishments .

In addition to various projects in the United States, he has created models for buildings in Dubai, Kuwait, Saudi Arabia, Singapore, Indonesia and England. He has also developed models for clients in Russia, South America, the Fiji Island and the Bahamas.

Selected models

 Riverside Office Building, Burbank (1997)
 Kingdom Center, Riyadh (1998)
 Newseum, Washington, D.C. (2006)
 Yankee Stadium, New York (2006)
 Sail @ Marina Bay, Singapore (2007)
 Comcast Center, Philadelphia (2008)
 Qatar Financial Center, Doha (2009)
 Sabah al-Salem University, Kuwait (2009)
 Lincoln Center Development (2009)
 New York City Police Academy, New York (2012)
 Tappan Zee Bridge, New York (2013)
 Hudson Yards Redevelopment Project, New York (2014)

References

External links 
 Richard Tenguerian website

1955 births
Living people
20th-century American architects
Ethnic Armenian architects
Model makers
Pratt Institute alumni
Syrian emigrants to the United States
Syrian people of Armenian descent
American people of Armenian descent
21st-century American architects